Fangschleuse railway station is a railway station serving Grünheide (Mark) and Freienbrink, in the State of Brandenburg, Germany. The station is located on the Berlin–Wrocław railway (now servicing Frankfurt (Oder) station to Warsaw, not Wrocław). The train services are operated by Deutsche Bahn.

Train services
The station is served by the following service(s):

Regional services  Magdeburg – Brandenburg – Potsdam – Berlin – Erkner – Fürstenwalde – Frankfurt (Oder) (– Cottbus)

References

External links

Railway stations in Brandenburg